VMA may refer to:

Academies
 Visayan Maritime Academy, a private maritime college in the Philippines
 Vojnomedicinska akademija, the transliterated Serbian name for the Military Medical Academy (Serbia)

Awards
 MTV Video Music Awards
 Vicky Metcalf Award, an award presented to writers of children's works in Canada

Science
 Vanillylmandelic acid, a metabolite in urine which may be measured to diagnose medical disorders
 Vitreomacular adhesion, a disease of the human eye where vitreous gel remains partially attached to the retina

Other uses
 Marine Attack Squadron, a type of aircraft squadron of the United States Marine Corps
 Virgin Mobile Australia, a cellphone provider in Australia